Branislav Angelovski (born 21 February 1977) is a former Macedonian handball player who last played for HC Dobrogea Sud Constanța, and also played for the Macedonian national handball team.

References

External links
HC Dobrogea Sud Constanta

Living people
1977 births
Macedonian male handball players
HC Dobrogea Sud Constanța players
Expatriate handball players
Macedonian expatriate sportspeople in Romania
Macedonian expatriate sportspeople in Croatia
Sportspeople from Bitola
RK Vardar players
RK Zagreb players